William Steiger may refer to:
Bill Steiger (American football), American football player
William A. Steiger, U.S. Representative from Wisconsin
William R. Steiger, political appointee in the U.S. Department of Health and Human Services under George W. Bush